Vvedenovka is a rural locality (a selo) in Arginsky Selsoviet of Seryshevsky District, Amur Oblast, Russia. The population was 263 as of 2018. There are 4 streets.

Geography 
Vvedenovka is located on the Zeya River, 31 km north of Seryshevo (the district's administrative centre) by road. Arga is the nearest rural locality.

References 

Rural localities in Seryshevsky District